Bat Trang may refer to:

 Bat Trang (Cambodia), a commune in Cambodia
 Bát Tràng, an old village of Hanoi, Vietnam
 Bát Tràng porcelain, a type of ceramics made in the village of the same name